In Māori mythology,  Tinirau is a guardian of fish. He is a son of Tangaroa, the god of the sea. His home at Motutapu (sacred island) is surrounded with pools for breeding fish. He also has several pet whales.

Hinauri, sister to the Māui brothers, had married Irawaru, who was transformed into a dog by Māui-tikitiki. In her grief Hinauri throws herself into the sea. She does not drown but is cast ashore at the home of Tinirau, where she attracts his attention by muddying the pools he uses as mirrors. She marries Tinirau and uses incantations to kill his other two wives, who had attacked her out of jealousy (Biggs 1966:450).

When her child Tūhuruhuru is born, the ritual birth ceremony is performed by Kae, a priest. After this is done, Tinirau lends Kae his pet whale to take him home. In spite of strict instructions to the contrary, Kae forces the whale, Tutu-nui, into shallow water, where it dies, and is roasted and eaten by Kae and his people. When he learns of this Tinirau is furious and sends Hinauri with a party of women (often they are Tinirau's sisters) to capture Kae, who is to be identified by his overlapping front teeth. The sisters perform indecent dances to make him laugh. When he laughs, they see his crooked teeth. Then the women sing a magic song which puts Kae into a deep sleep, and carry him back to Motutapu. When Kae wakes from his sleep he is in Tinirau's house. Tinirau taunts him for his treachery, and kills him (Grey 1970:69, Tregear 1891:110, Biggs 1966:450).

Later Tūhuruhuru is killed by the tribe of Popohorokewa for the death of Kae. In turn, Tinirau calls on Whakatau to destroy the Popohorokewa, which he did by burning them all in the house called Tihi-o-manono (Biggs 1966:450).

In a South Island account, Tinirau, mounted on Tutunui, meets Kae, who is in a canoe. Kae borrows Tutunui, and Tinirau goes on his way to find Hine-te-iwaiwa, travelling on a large nautilus that he borrows from his friend Tautini. When Tinirau smells the south wind he knows that his whale is being roasted (Tregear 1891:110).

See also
 Tinirau - general Polynesian
 Kinilau - Hawaii
 Tinilau and Ae - Samoa
 Sinilau and Kae (and Longopoa) - Tonga

Notes

References
B.G. Biggs, 'Maori Myths and Traditions' in A. H. McLintock (editor), Encyclopaedia of New Zealand, 3 Volumes. (Government Printer: Wellington), 1966, II:447-454.
George Grey, Polynesian Mythology, Illustrated edition, reprinted 1976. (Whitcombe and Tombs: Christchurch), 1956.
H.M. Mead, Neil Grove, Ngā Pēpeha a ngā Tīpuna, The Sayings of the Ancestors (Victoria University Press: Wellington), 2001, 
E. R. Tregear, Maori-Polynesian Comparative Dictionary (Lyon and Blair: Lambton Quay), 1891.

Māori mythology
Legendary Māori people